Stony Brook flows into Schoharie Creek by Schoharie, New York.

References

Rivers of New York (state)
Rivers of Schoharie County, New York